Peter E. Torosian is an American politician from the state of New Hampshire. A Republican, Torosian has represented the 14th Rockingham district in the New Hampshire House of Representatives since 2016. In the State House, he represents the towns of Atkinson and Plaistow.

He has a BS in Business Administration from Northeastern University. He has been married to his wife for 39 years. He has two sons and two granddaughters.

As of 2022, Torosian is running for the New Hampshire Senate in the 22nd district. He is seeking to replace Chuck Morse who is running for the United States Senate. He lost the primary to Daryl Abbas.

References

External links
 Electoral history

21st-century American politicians
Republican Party members of the New Hampshire House of Representatives
Northeastern University alumni
Living people
Year of birth missing (living people)